Annemarie Haensch was a German international table tennis player.

Table tennis career
She won a gold medal in the team event at the 1934 World Table Tennis Championships for Germany, with Anita Felguth, Astrid Krebsbach and Mona Rüster Muller.

See also
 List of table tennis players
 List of World Table Tennis Championships medalists

References

German female table tennis players
World Table Tennis Championships medalists